Cox-Ange House is a historic home located at Winterville, Pitt County, North Carolina. It was built about 1900 to 1904, and is a two-story, "L"-shaped, vernacular Queen Anne style frame dwelling with a one-story wing.  An addition was built about 1910.  It features a one-story, wraparound porch with a small sleeping porch on the second story.  Also on the property are the contributing barn (c. 1900–1904), garage (c. 1930), wash house (c. 1930), and landscaped yard.

It was listed on the National Register of Historic Places in 2000.

References

Houses on the National Register of Historic Places in North Carolina
Queen Anne architecture in North Carolina
Houses completed in 1904
Houses in Pitt County, North Carolina
National Register of Historic Places in Pitt County, North Carolina